Doug Cunningham or Douglas Cunningham may refer to:

 Doug Cunningham (politician) (born 1954), former Nebraska State Senator
 Doug Cunningham (American football) (1945–2015), American football running back
 Douglas Cunningham (American football) (born 1955), American football wide receiver
 Douglas Gordon Cunningham (1908–1992), Canadian Forces general
 J. Douglas Cunningham (born 1940), Associate Chief Justice of the Ontario Superior Court of Justice